This is a list of films produced by the Tollywood film industry based in Hyderabad in 1961.

References

External links
 Earliest Telugu language films at IMDb.com (332 to 356)

1961
Telugu films
Telugu